Marmorofusus nicobaricus, common name : the Nicobar spindle,  is a species of sea snail, a marine gastropod mollusc in the family Fasciolariidae, the spindle snails, the tulip snails and their allies.

Description
The shell size varies between 75 mm and 180 mm

Distribution
This species occurs in the Pacific Ocean off Japan, New South Wales, Australia, New Guinea and Hawaii.

References

 Callomon P. & Snyder M.A. (2019). The genus Fusinus in the northwestern Pacific. Special Publication of the Malacological Society of Japan. 4: 1-122 page(s): 79, figs 175-180 
 Snyder M.A. & Lyons W.G. (2014). The Fusinus nicobaricus (Röding, 1798) group: Marmarofusus gen . nov., with descriptions of three new species (Gastropoda: Fasciolariidae). Vita Malacologica. 12: 37-53

External links
 Röding P.F. (1798). Museum Boltenianum sive Catalogus cimeliorum e tribus regnis naturæ quæ olim collegerat Joa. Fried Bolten, M. D. p. d. per XL. annos proto physicus Hamburgensis. Pars secunda continens Conchylia sive Testacea univalvia, bivalvia & multivalvia. Trapp, Hamburg. viii, 199 pp
 Baird W. (1873). Shells. Pp. 432-454, pls 36-42, In: Brenchley J.L. (ed.), Jottings during the Cruise of the H. M. S. Curaçoa among the South Sea Islands in 1865. London: Longmans, Green, and Co. xxviii + 487 pp., pls 1-50, fold outs.

nicobaricus
Gastropods described in 1798